Craigmount may refer to:

 Craigmount High School, non-denominational secondary school in Edinburgh, Scotland
 Craigmount School, a private school in Edinburgh, 1874–1966

See also
 Craigmont (disambiguation)